Steven Robert Alten (born August 21, 1959, Philadelphia, Pennsylvania) is an American science-fiction author. He is best known for his Meg series of novels set around the fictitious survival of the megalodon, a giant, prehistoric shark.

Biography 

Alten holds a bachelor's degree from the Pennsylvania State University, a master's in sports medicine from the University of Delaware, and a doctorate in sports administration from Temple University. Alten is the founder and director of Adopt-An-Author, a nationwide secondary-school free-reading program promoting works from six authors, including his own.

Bibliography

Novels 

Meg series:
 Meg: A Novel of Deep Terror (1997), revised and expanded edition published by Tsunami books in 2005, republished in 2015 as an anniversary edition with the addition of Meg: Origins by Viper Press
 1.1. Meg, Angel of Death: Survival (2020), novella
 The Trench, or The Trench: Meg 2 (1999)
 Meg: Primal Waters (2004)
 Meg: Hell's Aquarium (2009)
 Meg: Origins (E-Book, 2011), prequel
 Meg: Nightstalkers (2016)
 Meg: Generations (2018)
 Meg: Purgatory (2022)

Domain, or The Mayan trilogy:
 Domain, or The Mayan Prophecy (2001)
 Resurrection, or The Mayan Resurrection (2004)
 Phobos: Mayan Fear, or The Mayan Destiny (2009)

The Loch series:
 The Loch (2005)
 Vostok (2015)
 The Loch: Heaven's Lake (2019)

Stand-alones:
 Fathom (1998)
 Goliath (2002)
 The Shell Game (2007)
 Grim Reaper: End of Days (2010)
 The Omega Project (2013)
 Sharkman (2014)
 Undisclosed (2017)

Comics 

 Meg: The Graphic Novel (2018), with J.S. Earls and Mike S. Miller

Adaptations

 A film adaptation of Meg: A Novel of Deep Terror, titled The Meg, was released August 10, 2018, after years in development hell. It is directed by Jon Turteltaub and stars Jason Statham as Jonas Taylor.
 The film adaptation of The Trench, titled The Meg 2: The Trench, is scheduled to be released August 4, 2023. Directed by Ben Wheatley.

References

External links

Living people
1959 births
20th-century American novelists
20th-century American male writers
21st-century American novelists
American male novelists
American science fiction writers
Writers from Philadelphia
Temple University alumni
Pennsylvania State University alumni
University of Delaware alumni
People with Parkinson's disease
American male short story writers
20th-century American short story writers
21st-century American short story writers
21st-century American male writers
Novelists from Pennsylvania